Jaqi Jiwata (Aymara jaqi man, jiwata dead, "dead man", also spelled Jakke Jihuata) is a mountain in the Bolivian Andes which reaches a height of approximately . It is located in the La Paz Department, Inquisivi Province, Colquiri Municipality. Jaqi Jiwata lies between Iru Pata in the southwest and Qala Piwrani in the northeast.

References 

Mountains of La Paz Department (Bolivia)